Lyria poppei is a species of sea snail, a marine gastropod mollusk in the family Volutidae, the volutes.

Description
The length of the shell attains 42.2 mm.

Distribution
This marine species occurs off the Norfolk Ridge, New Caledonia.

References

 Bail P. 2002. Two new species of Lyria (Gastropoda: Volutidae) from New Caledonian waters. Novapex 3(4): 133-137
 Bouchet, P.; Fontaine, B. (2009). List of new marine species described between 2002-2006. Census of Marine Life

Volutidae
Gastropods described in 2002